Lovro Medić (born 23 October 1990) is a Croatian professional footballer who plays for NK Zagreb as a forward.

Club career
A product of the NK Zagreb academy, Medić made his Prva HNL debut in the 2009–10 season, starting in the 6 March 2010 1-0 away loss against NK Lokomotiva. He became a first team regular the following season, which drew controversy, and outrage from the Zagreb fans, the White Angels, as they believe that to be a case of nepotism, as Lovro is the son of the controversial NK Zagreb president, Dražen Medić, their dissatisfaction bolstered by the player's long scoring drought, broken only in 15 October 2011 when he scored the game-winning goal in the 88th minute of their 0-1 away win against NK Istra 1961. He remained, nonetheless, a fixture in the following seasons. On 30 June 2016, he signed for Portuguese Primeira Liga club Boavista F.C. He remained without a club between 2017-2018, before resigning with NK Zagreb.

References

External links
 
 
 

1990 births
Living people
Footballers from Zagreb
Association football forwards
Croatian footballers
NK Zagreb players
Boavista F.C. players
G.D. Gafanha players
Croatian Football League players
First Football League (Croatia) players
Campeonato de Portugal (league) players
Croatian expatriate footballers
Expatriate footballers in Portugal
Croatian expatriate sportspeople in Portugal